Salih Hassan (born 26 December 1962) is a British rower. He competed at the 1984 Summer Olympics, 1988 Summer Olympics and the 1992 Summer Olympics.

References

External links
 

1962 births
Living people
British male rowers
Olympic rowers of Great Britain
Rowers at the 1984 Summer Olympics
Rowers at the 1988 Summer Olympics
Rowers at the 1992 Summer Olympics
Rowers from Greater London